Stones Bitter Super League II was the official name for the year 1997's Super League championship season, the 103rd season of top-level professional rugby league football in Britain, and the second to be played in summer.

Teams
Twelve teams were selected to play in the second Super League season, however Salford Reds were promoted into the League, taking the place of relegated Workington Town.

Season summary
For this season, the Leeds club added 'Rhinos' to their name for the first time.

During the year a secondary title, known as the Stone's Premiership, was also played for the last time on Sunday 28 September, with the final being contested between Wigan Warriors and St. Helens with Wigan coming out victorious 33-20 after a Harry Sunderland Trophy-winning performance by captain Andy Farrell.

At the end of the season Bradford Bulls were crowned League champions by virtue of finishing the season at the top of the table.

At the end of the 1997 season the Paris Saint-Germain club was dissolved. A post-season Super League Test series between Australia and Great Britain was also held in England.

Final Standings

Premiership

All 12 teams qualified for and competed in a knockout play-off series for the Premiership Trophy. Wigan defeated St Helens in the last final at Old Trafford. Following this season it was merged into the Super League Championship so one true national champion could be determined.

See also
1997 World Club Championship
1997 Challenge Cup

References

External links
Super League II at wigan.rlfans.com
Super League II results at rugby-league-world.com
Super League II at rugbyleagueproject.com

 
1997 in English rugby league
1997 in French rugby league